Portugal have participated in eight UEFA European Championship editions. Their first tournament was in 1984, and the side have advanced past the group stage in every edition they've participated in so far. Portugal have reached the semi-finals on five occasions, and reached the final as hosts in 2004, however losing to tournament underdogs Greece. They captured their first major tournament win after defeating hosts France 1–0 in the final of Euro 2016.

UEFA Euro 1984

Group stage

Knockout stage

Semi-finals

UEFA Euro 1996

Group stage

Knockout stage

Quarter-finals

UEFA Euro 2000

Group stage

Knockout stage

Quarter-finals

Semi-finals

UEFA Euro 2004

Group stage

Knockout stage

Quarter-finals

Semi-finals

Final

UEFA Euro 2008

Group stage

Knockout phase

Quarter-finals

UEFA Euro 2012

Group stage

Knockout phase

Quarter-finals

Semi-finals

UEFA Euro 2016

Group stage

Ranking of third-placed teams

Knockout phase

Round of 16

Quarter-finals

Semi-finals

Final

UEFA Euro 2020

Group stage

Ranking of third-placed teams

Knockout phase

Round of 16

Overall record

*Draws include knockout matches decided via penalty shoot-out.
**Gold background colour indicates that the tournament was won.
***Red border colour indicates that the tournament was held on home soil.

Matches

References

Countries at the UEFA European Championship
Portugal at the UEFA European Championship
History of the Portugal national football team